Morgan Alexander (born February 19, 1982) is a Canadian bobsledder who competed from 2002 to 2006. He won a bronze medal in the four-man event at the 2005 FIBT World Championships in Calgary. Alexander also finished fourth in the four-man event at the 2006 Winter Olympics in Turin.

Alexander was born in Regina, Saskatchewan.

References
Bobsleigh four-man world championship medalists since 1930
FIBT profile

1982 births
Bobsledders at the 2006 Winter Olympics
Canadian male bobsledders
Living people
Sportspeople from Regina, Saskatchewan
Olympic bobsledders of Canada